Southworth Library is a historic library building located at Dryden in Tompkins County, New York. It is a -story masonry building with a steeply pitched gable roof.  It features a prominent bell tower with a Seth Thomas clock  and circular windows include carved stone gargoyles.  It is a distinctive, small scale example of Eclectic style civic architecture. It was designed with open grid flooring in stack rooms to facilitate air circulation and two reading rooms. It was listed on the National Register of Historic Places in 1984.

The library was founded by Jennie McGraw. It opened in an existing building on South and Main Streets on  September 25, 1884 and later in a building constructed for the library in 1894. McGraw was the granddaughter of John Southworth of Dryden, who became a millionaire working as a farmer. She used money to create a memorial to her mother and grandfather by establishing a $30,000 trust fund to build and maintain a library in Dryden. On April 22, 1883, the Southworth Library Association was incorporated.

References

External links
Southworth Library, Dryden New York, Finger Lakes Library system

Library buildings completed in 1894
Libraries on the National Register of Historic Places in New York (state)
Buildings and structures in Tompkins County, New York
Education in Tompkins County, New York
National Register of Historic Places in Tompkins County, New York